The mottle-cheeked tyrannulet (Phylloscartes ventralis) is a generally common, small species of bird in the family Tyrannidae. It occurs in two disjunct populations, one associated with montane Atlantic Forest in south-eastern Brazil, eastern Paraguay, north-eastern Argentina and Uruguay, and another found in forest growing on the east Andean slope in Peru, Bolivia and north-western Argentina. A very active bird usually seen with its tail held cocked.

References

mottle-cheeked tyrannulet
Birds of the Atlantic Forest
Birds of Brazil
Birds of Uruguay
Birds of the Yungas
mottle-cheeked tyrannulet
Taxonomy articles created by Polbot